Gay Search is a British television presenter and journalist. She worked on the BBC television series Gardeners' World with Geoff Hamilton, and on the series Front Gardens.

Search started her horticultural career writing the garden column for Woman magazine, with help from Alan Titchmarsh, who prevented her from writing "daft" things. She devised and hosted gardening shows for BBC2 from 1988. She worked as gardening editor for Sainsbury magazine for 13 years as well as the Radio Times.

She is also patron of the British Thyroid Foundation.

As a teenager, Search was a bystander in the capture of the Portland spy ring; her parents' house was used to surveil Peter and Helen Kroger, two members of the ring.

Bibliography
 Front Gardens
 Gardening from Scratch
 Gardening without a garden
 Delia's Kitchen Garden, written with Delia Smith.
 Perfect Plants for Problem Places

References

English gardeners
British television presenters
English garden writers
Living people
Year of birth missing (living people)